Kristrún Rut Hassing Antonsdóttir (born 12 October 1994) is an Icelandic multi-sport athlete. She played in both the Icelandic top-tier basketball and football leagues and later professionally in football overseas.

Early life
Kristrún was born in Odense, Denmark to Anton Tómasson and Helga Hassing.

Football career
In October 2017, Kristrún signed with Serie B club A.S.D. Chieti. In her first game, she scored after 2 minutes in a 4–0 victory against Real Colombo. For the season, she appeared in 17 games for Chieti, scoring 5 goals.

She returned to Selfoss in May 2018 before signing with Serie A club A.S. Roma in July the same year. In April 2019, she left Roma and signed with Avaldsnes IL.

In June 2021, Kristrún signed back with Selfoss.

Basketball career
Kristrún played five season with Hamar from 2009 to 2015 and helped the team to the 2010 Úrvalsdeild finals. She spent the 2012–2013 season playing for Potomac High School in Dumfries, Virginia.

References

External links
 
 A.S. Roma profile
 

1994 births
Living people
Kristrun Rut Antonsdottir
Kristrun Rut Antonsdottir
Kristrun Rut Antonsdottir
Kristrun Rut Antonsdottir
Kristrun Rut Antonsdottir
Kristrun Rut Antonsdottir
Kristrun Rut Antonsdottir
Women's association football midfielders
Guards (basketball)
Ballerup-Skovlunde Fodbold (women) players
Danish people of Icelandic descent
Sportspeople from Odense